CKGW-FM is a Christian music radio station broadcasting at 89.3 FM in Chatham-Kent, Ontario, Canada. The station is owned by United Christian Broadcasters Canada (UCB). It was originally a rebroadcaster of CKJJ-FM from Belleville, but became an independent station in April 2007.

References

External links 
 
 
 

Kgw
Kgw
Radio stations established in 2007
2007 establishments in Ontario